Karl Michael Tilleman (born November 1, 1960) is an attorney and two-time Canadian Olympian.  Among his accomplishments, Tilleman holds the Olympic record for the most three-point baskets in a single basketball game, hitting ten of sixteen three-point shots, and scoring 21 points in a row for Canada, in a game against Spain in the 1988 Seoul Olympics (highlight video).  His Olympic and other international performances against such hall of fame basketball players as Michael Jordan, Karl Malone, and Charles Barkley led team coach, Jack Donohue, to call him "the best three-point shooter in the world."  His Olympic three-point record has never been broken, but has been tied twice, most recently by Carmelo Anthony of the US, in 2012.

Tilleman had some of his best games against the United States. For example, in the 1983 Pan American Games, Tilleman scored 28 points in a head-to-head showdown with Michael Jordan; Tilleman's "excellent shooting" kept Canada in that tight game, which was tied 15 times.  In the 1987 World University Games, where "Canada challenged the U.S. men all the way," Tilleman again led Canada (and all players) scoring 21 points against a talented U.S. team led by future NBA stars B. J. Armstrong (Chicago Bulls) and Mitch Richmond (Golden State), and coached by the iconic Mike Krzyzewski.

Tilleman has also excelled as an attorney. He was Law clerk for former Chief Justice Warren Burger and Justice Clarence Thomas at the Supreme Court of the United States in 1992–93.  He and Nick Bravin appear to be the only Olympians to also clerk for a U.S. Supreme Court Justice.

Tilleman is a two-time Olympian.  He had strong performances in both the 1984 LA Olympics, where Canada finished fourth, and in 1988 in Seoul, where Canada finished sixth.  In addition to setting the three-point record in 1988, Tilleman also was Canada's second leading scorer and had the highest points per minute of any Canadian player.  In 1984, Tilleman again had the highest points per minute of any Canadian player (with a minimum of 50 minutes played).  In Canada's initial game against the United States in 1984 (led again by Michael Jordan), Tilleman was Canada's second leading scorer with 10 points (highlight video).  In the 1984 bronze-medal game, Tilleman played especially well and was again Canada's second-leading scorer with 13 points (shooting 60% from the field), in a hard-fought loss to Yugoslavia, where Canada had pulled to within one point with one minute left in the game (highlight video).

Tilleman was drafted by the Denver Nuggets as their second pick and the 79th overall in 1984; he was the fourth highest NBA draft pick of any Canadian University basketball player in history.

Tilleman had an unprecedented athletic career at the University of Calgary in Canada.  He was voted the University's all-time greatest athlete receiving five times more votes than the closest runner-up.  He is the only Calgary Dino ever drafted into the NBA. Tilleman has been inducted into the Alberta Sports Hall of Fame (Alberta Sports Hall of Fame's inductee video) and the Canada West Hall of Fame. He also has been inducted into the University of Calgary's Hall of Fame and had his jersey retired by the University.

Tilleman and his Canadian teammates shocked the world in 1983 when they struck gold at the World Student Games held in Edmonton, Alberta, Canada.  Canada's 1983 gold-medal performance was one of the two finest moments in Canada's rich basketball history (the other was Canada's silver medal in men's basketball at the 1936 Berlin Olympics).  In winning the 1983 Universiade gold medal, Canada solidly defeated powerhouse teams from the United States and Yugoslavia, both of which were laden with future NBA stars such as Charles Barkley, Karl Malone, and Drazen Petrovic. Canada's 1983 Universiade gold medal, Canada's only international gold medal in men's basketball, has been described as the "Miracle on Wood."

Tilleman was internationally recognized for his "superb shooting" skills with "ballistic range," which allowed him to take games "into his own hands," as he did when he scored 22 points in the second half against Puerto Rico in the 1983 Pan American Games, and when he drained 23 points in one quarter in the 1988 Utah Summer Games.  Tilleman set his personal three-point record in 1986 against the Montana State Bobcats, who won the Big Sky Conference and went undefeated at home that season.  Tilleman scored 50 points - on the Cats' home court - hitting 13 three-pointers and setting a record for the most points in a men's basketball game at Montana State's Worthington Arena (highlight video).

Tilleman holds numerous Canadian basketball records.  He hit every free throw he attempted during the entire 1983–84 regular season, except one, resulting in a record-setting 98% free throw percentage that has never been broken by any Canadian or U.S. university player.  Tilleman broke the Canadian University scoring record with a 32.9 points-per-game average (before Canada adopted the three-point line).  He was named the most outstanding Canadian male basketball player two years consecutively, the first to accomplish that feat.  Tilleman was the Canadian scoring champion in 1982 and 1983. He was voted a first team All-Canadian 4 consecutive years.  And, he broke the University of Calgary's all-time point-per-game record and became Calgary's all-time leading scorer averaging 25.9 point-per-game (again, before the three-point line). Tilleman was the Canada-West Conference scoring champion 3 consecutive years (82–84), the Conference player of the year 3 consecutive years (81–83), and a unanimous first-team Conference all-star 4 consecutive years.

In addition to his respected athletic career, Tilleman has distinguished himself as an attorney and in his charitable service in the Church of Jesus Christ of Latter-day Saints (LDS Church).  Tilleman has been the managing partner of Steptoe & Johnson's Phoenix office, and has held many firm leadership positions, while also representing many high-profile companies, including the Harlem Globetrotters, the University of Southern California, Western Union, State Farm, AIG, and Metlife, Inc. In March 2019, Tilleman led a "powerhouse" litigation group that joined the Phoenix office of the Dentons law firm, which is the largest law firm in the world. In the LDS Church, which has no paid local clergy, Tilleman has served as a bishop and stake president in Phoenix, Arizona, and as mission president of the Canada Vancouver Mission.  Tilleman also served as an Area Seventy in the Church's North America Southwest Area from 2015 to 2020.

Professional/Legal career
After graduating from the University of Calgary, Tilleman studied at the Brigham Young University's J. Reuben Clark Law School, eventually graduating summa cum laude (with highest distinction), Order of the Coif in 1990 while also serving as the Editor-in-Chief of the BYU Law Review.  Tilleman's record-setting performance in the 1988 Olympics was particularly noteworthy in that he was already in his second year of law school, and competing for the top spot in his law-school class, while at the same time training for, and then representing Canada in, the 1988 Olympics.

After graduation, he clerked for Hon. John T. Noonan of the United States Court of Appeals, Ninth Circuit from 1990–1991. A year later, Tilleman had the prestigious honor of being selected as a law clerk by both Chief Justice Warren Burger and Justice Clarence Thomas at the United States Supreme Court from 1992–93.  No other Canadian Olympian has also been selected as a law clerk by a Justice of the Supreme Court of the United States.

From 2000 through 2019, Tilleman was a partner at Steptoe & Johnson, where he was appointed managing partner of Steptoe's Phoenix office; Tilleman also served as the Practice Group Leader for Steptoe's worldwide complex commercial disputes group, Steptoe's largest practice group. His practice at Steptoe, and now at Dentons, focuses on litigating antitrust, intellectual property, RICO, complex contract, and high-profile insurance disputes. He has similarly earned awards and recognition as an attorney, which include being selected to Best Lawyers in America for insurance law from 2011–16, Southwest Super Lawyers for business litigation from 2009–15, Chambers USA: America's Leading Business Lawyers for general commercial litigation from 2011–12, and Arizona's Finest Lawyers in 2011. Additionally, Tilleman was interviewed by the White House for an appointment as a Federal-Court Judge, but realizing the position would considerably alter his priorities, he declined the offer.  His clients include high-profile insurance, money transfer and entertainment companies.  In a non-exclusive list, he was the lead trial lawyer for the Harlem Globetrotters in an intellectual property action filed in Federal Court by former Globetrotter superstars Meadowlark Lemon, Curly Neal, and others; Tilleman represented the University of Southern California in a multi-million antitrust and RICO lawsuit; he has represented Western Union in various financial-transaction cases, as well as State Farm, Allstate, AIG, and Metlife in numerous high-profile insurance cases.

LDS Church Service
In between his Olympic performances, Tilleman served as a full-time missionary for the Church of Jesus Christ of Latter-day Saints (LDS Church) in the California Arcadia Mission, speaking Spanish and working in Latino neighborhoods throughout the Los Angeles area. Additionally, while living in Phoenix, he was called to serve as a bishop and as a stake president. On March 26, 2011, he accepted a three-year assignment from the Church to serve as the mission president of the Canada Vancouver Mission. He put his legal practice on hold to fulfill the assignment, which ended on July 1, 2014.  While serving as a mission president, Tilleman suffered a devastating fall, after being attacked by a bull mastiff dog, which left him paralyzed from the neck down because of the trauma, including a tear in the center of his spinal cord.  He fought to overcome that paralyzing and potentially life-threatening injury to complete his three-year term as a mission president and then continue his practice of law with Steptoe & Johnson. Tilleman served as an Area Seventy in the Church's North America Southwest Area from April 2015 to October 2020.

Athletic career

International career
Tilleman played for the Canadian Men's National Team from 1981 to 1984 and from 1986 to 1988. In 1983, he represented Canada on the team that won Gold in the World Student Games held in Edmonton, Alberta, Canada.  Later that year, in the 1983 Pan American Games in Caracas, Venezuela, Tilleman knocked down 28 points despite being guarded most of the game by Michael Jordan, and before the three-point shot was adopted for international basketball.  He participated in the 1984 Summer Olympics in Los Angeles, California, where Canada finished fourth overall.  In that Olympics, Tilleman averaged 7.4 ppg, 1.4 rpg, and 1.1 apg, and Tilleman scored 10 points in Canada's initial game against the United States, which was his first rematch against Michael Jordan after the 1983 Pan American Games.

After interrupting his basketball career to serve a mission for his church, Tilleman continued to represent Canada from 1986 through the 1988 Summer Olympics in Seoul Korea, where he averaged 11.9 ppg and 1.6 rpg, which points per game was second highest on the Canadian team in that Olympics.  He had exceptional performances against Egypt and Spain where he scored 29 and 37 points respectively, with his shooting performance against Spain setting an Olympic record for three-point shots made in single game (10/16).

In the mid 80s, Tilleman enjoyed tremendous success competing against top-caliber NCAA talent and future NBA players in AAU tournaments across the U.S.  For example, playing against many Big Sky Conference and other NCAA Conference Allstars, Tilleman "blistered the nets" in the 1983 Western Invitational Tournament in Lewistown, Montana, averaging 41.25 points per game, which set a record for the prestigious 30-year-old tournament.  The next year, playing for the Brewster Heights Packing Company, Tilleman and his teammates (including three other Canadian Olympic team members) won the WIT by narrowly defeating the Lewistown Boosters, a team led by John Stockton, the future NBA Allstar and all-time NBA assist leader.

University

First Season (1979–80)
Prior to university, Tilleman attended Sir Winston Churchill High School where he led his team to the Calgary City Championship and later to the 4A Provincial Championship Finals. He started his freshman year and averaged 14.1 points per game with a 49 field goal percentage, and 1.9 rebounds per game, and was selected as a Canada West Conference Second Team Allstar as a freshman.

Second Season (1980–81)
In his second season, Tilleman greatly enhanced his performance which brought increased recognition and honors.  He averaged 27.5 points per game, nabbed 4.8 rebounds per game, and had a 55.9 FG% -- a remarkable season-long shooting percentage given Tilleman's range and how heavily he was guarded by opposing teams. With this performance he was named the University of Calgary Male Athlete of the Year, Conference Player of the Year, a unanimous first team Canada West Athletic Association all-star, and a CIAU first team all-Canadian.

Third Season (1981–82)
In his third season he almost averaged a double-double with 32.9 ppg and 8.1 rpg with a 47.5 FG%  With this scoring, Tilleman broke the previously held CIAU points per game scoring record of 31.3 ppg. Additionally, he maintained his honors as first team Canada West all-star, Conference Player of the Year, and CIAU all-Canadian, while additionally  establishing himself as the CIAU MVP, and Conference and CIAU scoring champion of the year.

Fourth Season (1982–83)
In his fourth season Tilleman averaged 30.9 ppg and 4.1 rpg with a 51.5 FG%, which led him again to earn first team Canada West all-star, Conference player of the year, CIAU all-Canadian, and University of Calgary male Athlete of the Year awards, while additionally being recognized as the City of Calgary's Male Athlete of the Year by Calgary Sports Media.  His scoring again lead him to be the Conference and CIAU scoring champion of that year.

Fifth Season (1983–84)
In the 1983–1984 season Tilleman again averaged superb numbers with 31.2 ppg, 5.2 rpg, a 48.5 FG%, and an incredible 98 free throw percentage, missing only one free throw during the entire Canada West regular season. With this he again was recognized as a Canada West first team all-star, CIAU all-Canadian, and the Conference scoring champion. In 1984 after his collegiate eligibility, he was drafted in the fourth round by the Denver Nuggets; however, upon arriving in Denver, he suffered from the flu and a sprained ankle and was consequently cut from the team.

Post-career awards
After his final season game for the Dinos, Tilleman's number 30 jersey was retired by the university.  In 1995, he was inducted into the university's athletic hall of fame. On April 5, 2007, as part of a celebration of the university's 40th anniversary, Tilleman was voted on an online poll as the university's all-time greatest athlete, receiving 26 percent of the votes, more than five times the votes of any other athlete. In 2008, Tilleman was inducted into the Alberta Sports Hall of Fame.  In 2020, Tilleman was inducted into the Canada West Hall of Fame.

Personal life
Tilleman was born in Ogden, Utah to hard-working and loving parents, Bill and Jean Tilleman. He moved to Calgary, Alberta, Canada, as a young boy when his father accepted a teaching position at the University of Calgary.  Tilleman and his wife, Holly Benson Walker Tilleman, have been married since 1986, and have five children together: Karl Benson, Daniel William, Mary Barbara-Jean (Caywood), Michael Robert, and Sarah Elizabeth.  Karl and Holly also have eight granddaughters.

See also 
 List of law clerks of the Supreme Court of the United States (Chief Justice)
 List of law clerks of the Supreme Court of the United States (Seat 10)

References

External links
 Karl Tilleman: University of Calgary Hall of Fame
 Karl Tilleman: Basketball Reference

1960 births
Living people
Alberta Sports Hall of Fame inductees
American leaders of the Church of Jesus Christ of Latter-day Saints
American Mormon missionaries in the United States
Basketball players at the 1984 Summer Olympics
Basketball players at the 1988 Summer Olympics
Basketball players at the 1983 Pan American Games
Basketball players at the 1987 Pan American Games
Calgary Dinos men's basketball players
Canadian Latter Day Saints
Canadian leaders of the Church of Jesus Christ of Latter-day Saints
Canadian men's basketball players
Canadian Mormon missionaries in the United States
Denver Nuggets draft picks
J. Reuben Clark Law School alumni
Law clerks of the Supreme Court of the United States
Mission presidents (LDS Church)
Mormon missionaries in Canada
Olympic basketball players of Canada
Pan American Games competitors for Canada
Basketball people from Alberta
Latter Day Saints from Utah
Latter Day Saints from Arizona
Universiade medalists in basketball
Universiade gold medalists for Canada
Shooting guards
Medalists at the 1983 Summer Universiade